Beck Row is a village in Suffolk, England. The village is close to RAF Mildenhall and is home to about 3000 people. Culturally, the village has an old church and a beacon dating from the time of the Battle of Trafalgar. A Victoria Cross recipient, Ron Middleton, is buried in the local cemetery.

The village is part of the civil parish of Beck Row, Holywell Row and Kenny Hill.

External links

 Wikimapia: Legendary hotel and pub for visiting USAF airmen.

Villages in Suffolk
Forest Heath